Winston Bergwijn (born April 20, 1978), known professionally as Winne, is a Dutch rapper.

Career 
Winne was born in Paramaribo, Suriname, and moved to Rotterdam at a young age. He started rapping in English, initially under the name Static, until his friends encouraged him to rap in Dutch. With his group D.C.O., he performed at various locations in Rotterdam. In 2005, Winne suddenly became known to a wider audience when his track "Top 3 MC", produced by Kapitein Mo, was released on the internet. A few months later, the track "Pomp Die Shit!" was released on the compilation album What's da Flavor?!, which left its mark on the Dutch hip hop scene. Then he appeared on albums of Opgezwolle and U-Niq. In 2006, he was signed by the label TopNotch.

In 2007, he released his debut EP Onoverwinnelijk, which included the tracks "Top 3 MC", "Pomp die Shit!" and "Begrijp me niet verkeerd". For the latter he won a State Award in 2008 for the best music video of that year.

In 2009, he followed up with his debut studio album Winne Zonder Strijd. The album contained the live and internet hits "W.I.N.N.E.", "Alles Wat Ik Wil" featuring GMB and "Lotgenoot". The same year he released the compilation mixtape So So Lobi,  in collaboration with Patta.

In 2011, he was seen with Henny Vrienten of Doe Maar in an episode of Ali B op volle toeren.

Discography 
Albums
 Onoverwinnelijk EP (2007)
 Winne Zonder Strijd (2009)
 Oprecht Door Zee (2018)

References

External links
 Profile at AllMusic
 Profile at TopNotch

1978 births
Living people
Dutch rappers
Surinamese emigrants to the Netherlands
People from Paramaribo
Musicians from Rotterdam